The Strömsholm Canal runs from Smedjebacken to Lake Mälaren near Strömsholm.

The canal took 18 years to build, between 1772 and 1795, to plans laid out by Johan Ullström. The main reason for it was the transport of iron produced by the many steelworks sited along the length of the waterway.
The opening of the Stockholm Wästerås-Bergslagen railway marked the beginning of its decline and today the restored canal is only used by pleasure craft.

Gallery

Bibliography
McKnight, Hugh, The Guinness Guide to Waterways of Western Europe, Guinness (1978)

External links

 Strömsholm canal - Official site

Canals in Sweden
Norrström basin
Canals opened in 1795